Stenobiini is a tribe of longhorn beetles of the subfamily Lamiinae. It was described by Breuning in 1950.

Taxonomy
 Aphalanthus Kolbe, 1894
 Emphreus Pascoe, 1864
 Plectroscapoides Teocchi, 1996
 Plectroscapus Gahan, 1890
 Stenobia Lacordaire, 1872
 Temnoscelis Chevrolat, 1855
 Temnosceloides Breuning & Téocchi, 1973

References

Stenobiini
Lamiinae